LORAN-C transmitter Helong is the Yankee secondary of the China North Sea  Loran-C Chain (GRI 7430). It uses a transmission power of 1200 kW.

References
http://www.megapulse.com/chaininfo.html 

Towers in China
LORAN-C transmitters in China